Zelimkhan "Kharachoevsky" Gushmazukayev  (January 1872; Kharachoy, Terek Oblast, Russian Empire – 26 September 1913; Shali, Russian Empire) (Kharachoyn Zelamkha) and better known simply as Zelimkhan, was a Chechen outlaw (known locally as an abrek) who gained fame in the late Russian Empire due to his spectacular bank and train robberies as part of a violent struggle with the Russian authorities. Since the Russian Revolution he has been mythologized as a version of a Chechen Robin Hood, first by the Bolsheviks (for fighting against the Tsarist regime) and later by Chechen nationalists. Today the name Zelimkhan is given to Chechen and Ingush children.

Together with Zelimkhan was his colleague and comrade, the Ingush abrek Sulumbek of Sagopshi, who participated in the most high-profile events associated with Zelimkhan.

During the early 20th century, after the events of 1905, Zelimkhan was a particular problem for the Russian governors of the restive region, and enjoyed the support of the local population. He would ultimately become a symbol of triumph over the Russian administration, committing brazen feats such as the robbery of the Kizlyar treasury, carried out in broad daylight on March 27, 1910 and distributing the money to poor people; he became varyingly seen as a fighter for "justice" or as one who continued the fight of the Muslim population for independence from Russia, being compared to Imam Shamil. In September 1913, Zelimkhan was killed in a short battle with tsarist forces near the village of Shali.

There was a statue of Zelimkhan outside the site of the village of Serzhen Yurt, which was destroyed during the First Chechen War.

Folk songs about Zelimkhan
There is a popular folk song about Zelimkhan.

Excerpt from a Khevsurian folk song about Zelimkhan:

References

Bibliography 
 
 Rebecca Ruth Gould, "Transgressive Sanctity: The Abrek in Chechen Culture," Kritika: Explorations in Russian and Eurasian History 8.2 (2007): 271–306.

1872 births
1913 deaths
People from Vedensky District
People from Terek Oblast
Chechen nationalists
Chechen warlords
Chechen people
People from the Russian Empire